Claude Landini (1 March 1926 – 30 May 2021) was a Swiss basketball player. He competed in the men's tournament at the 1948 Summer Olympics.

References

External links
 

1926 births
2021 deaths
Swiss men's basketball players
Olympic basketball players of Switzerland
Basketball players at the 1948 Summer Olympics
Sportspeople from Geneva